Paterniti is a surname. Notable people with the surname include:

Giovanni Paterniti (died 1911), American diplomat
Kelly Paterniti (born 1987), Australian actress
Michael Paterniti, American writer
Thomas H. Paterniti (1929–2017), American dentist and politician